Bolat Niyazymbetov (born September 19, 1972) is a Kazakhstani Light Welterweight boxer. He won a bronze medal in the 1996 Summer Olympics.

Olympic results
 Defeated Carlos Martínez (Mexico) 25-3
 Defeated Davis Mwale (Zambia) 11-3
 Defeated Babak Moghimi (Iran) 13-8
 Lost to Héctor Vinent (Cuba) 6-23

External links
 
 Sports Reference

1972 births
Living people
People from Taraz
Olympic boxers of Kazakhstan
Boxers at the 1996 Summer Olympics
Olympic bronze medalists for Kazakhstan
Olympic medalists in boxing
Asian Games medalists in boxing
Boxers at the 1994 Asian Games
Kazakhstani male boxers
Medalists at the 1996 Summer Olympics
Asian Games bronze medalists for Kazakhstan
Medalists at the 1994 Asian Games
Light-welterweight boxers
20th-century Kazakhstani people